Yevgeny Sergeyevich Kozel (born 22 February 2001) is a Belarusian professional footballer who plays for Baranovichi.

Honors
Shakhtyor Soligorsk
Belarusian Premier League: 2021

References

External links 
 
 

2001 births
Living people
People from Stolin District
Sportspeople from Brest Region
Belarusian footballers
Association football forwards
Belarusian expatriate footballers
Expatriate footballers in Latvia
FC Shakhtyor Soligorsk players
FC Gorodeya players
FC Sputnik Rechitsa players
FC Dynamo Brest players
FC Shakhtyor Petrikov players
FC Baranovichi players